Enterprise software, also known as enterprise application software (EAS), is computer software used to satisfy the needs of an organization rather than individual users. Such organizations include businesses, schools, interest-based user groups, clubs, charities, and governments. Enterprise software is an integral part of a (computer-based) information system; a collection of such software is called an enterprise system. These systems handle a number of operations in an organization to enhance the business and management reporting tasks. The systems must process the information at a relatively high speed and can be deployed across a variety of networks. 

Services provided by enterprise software are typically business-oriented tools. As enterprises have similar departments and systems in common, enterprise software is often available as a suite of customizable programs. Generally, the complexity of these tools requires specialist capabilities and specific knowledge. Enterprise computing is the information technology (IT) tool that businesses use for efficient production operations and back-office support. These IT tools cover database management, customer relationship management, supply chain management, business process management and so on.

Definitions
Enterprise software is a collection of computer programs that have common business applications, tools for modeling how the entire organization works, and development tools for building applications unique to the organization. The software is intended to solve an enterprise-wide problem, rather than a departmental problem. Enterprise-level software aims to improve the enterprise's productivity and efficiency by providing business logic support functionality.

According to Martin Fowler, "Enterprise applications are about the display, manipulation, and storage of large amounts of often complex data and the support or automation of business processes with that data."

Although there is no single, widely accepted list of enterprise software characteristics, they generally include performance, scalability, and robustness. Furthermore, enterprise software typically has interfaces to other enterprise software (for example LDAP to directory services) and is centrally managed (a single admin page, for example).

Enterprise application software performs business functions such as order processing, procurement, production scheduling, customer information management, energy management, and accounting. It is typically hosted on servers and provides simultaneous services to many users, typically over a computer network. This is in contrast to a single-user application that is executed on a user's personal computer and serves only one user at a time.

Enterprise system

Enterprise systems (ES) are large-scale enterprise software packages that support business processes, information flows, reporting, and data analytics in complex organizations. While ES are generally packaged enterprise application software (PEAS) systems they can also be bespoke, custom-developed systems created to support a specific organization's needs.

Types of enterprise systems include:
 enterprise resources planning (ERP) systems, 
 enterprise planning systems, and 
 customer relationship management software. 
Although data warehousing or business intelligence systems are enterprise-wide packaged application software often sold by ES vendors, since they do not directly support execution of business processes, they are often excluded from the term.

Enterprise systems are built on software platforms, such as SAP's NetWeaver and Oracle's Fusion, and databases.

From a hardware perspective, enterprise systems are the servers, storage and associated software that large businesses use as the foundation for their IT infrastructure. These systems are designed to manage large volumes of critical data and thus are typically designed to provide high levels of transaction performance and data security.

Types 
Enterprise software can be categorized by business function. Each type of enterprise application can be considered a "system" due to the integration with a firm's business processes. Categories of enterprise software may overlap due to this systemic interpretation. For example, IBM's Business Intelligence platform (Cognos), integrates with a predictive analytics platform (SPSS) and can obtain records from its database packages (Infosphere, DB2). Blurred lines between package functions make delimitation difficult, and larger software companies define these somewhat arbitrary categories in many ways. Nevertheless, certain industry-standard product categories have emerged, and these are shown below:

 Business Intelligence (BI)
 Business Process Management (BPM)
 Content Management System (CMS)
 Customer Relationship Management (CRM)
 DataBase Management System (DBMS) - such as Master Data Management (MDM) and Data Warehousing (DW, DWH or EDW)
 Enterprise Resource Planning (ERP) - which is a broad category covering  Accounting, Human Resource, Corporate performance and governance, Customer Services, Sales, Procurement, Production, and Distribution
 Enterprise Asset Management (EAM)
 Human Resource Management (HRM)
 Knowledge Management (KM)
 Low-code Development Platforms (LCDP)
 Product Data Management (PDM)
 Product Information Management (PIM)
 Product Lifecycle Management (PLM)
 Supply Chain Management (SCM)
 Software Configuration Management (SCM) - such as Version Control System (VCS)
 Networking and Information Security
 Intrusion Detection Prevention (IDS) - and by extension Intrusion Prevention System (IPS)
 Software Defined Networking (SDN) - including SD-WAN
 Security Information Event Management (SIEM) - which can combine Security Information Management (SIM) and Security Event Management (SEM)
 Others types of software which do not fit into well-known standard categories, including backup software, Billing Management, Accounting software

See also
 Application Release Automation Software
 Application software
 Business informatics
 Business software
 Enterprise architecture
 Enterprise forms automation
 Enterprise planning system
 Global Information Network Architecture
 IBM Smarter Computing
 Identity management
 Identity management system
 Information technology management
 Integrated business planning
 Management information system
 Operational risk management
 Retail software
 Server (computing)
 Strategic information system

References

 
Business software
Enterprise architecture